Languages of Macedonia may refer to:

 Languages of Macedonia (region), languages spoken in the geographical region of Macedonia
 Languages of Macedonia (Greece), languages spoken in the Greek region of Macedonia
 Languages of North Macedonia, languages spoken in the Republic of North Macedonia

See also
 Macedonia (disambiguation)
 Macedonian (disambiguation)
 Macedonian language (disambiguation)
 Slavic languages of Macedonia (disambiguation)